George Horne (born 12 May 1995) is a Scottish professional rugby union player who primarily plays scrum-half for the Glasgow Warriors in the United Rugby Championship. He has also represented Scotland at international level, having made his test debut against the United States during the 2018 Summer Internationals.

Rugby union career

Amateur career

Coming through the school set up, Horne was a pupil at Bell Baxter High School before moving to Strathallan School. He is currently studying physical education at the University of Edinburgh.

Horne has played for Howe of Fife and Currie.

Horne currently plays for amateur team Glasgow Hawks when not playing for the Warriors.

Horne was drafted to Glasgow Hawks in the Scottish Premiership for the 2017-18 season.

Professional career

Horne was one of the new inductees for season 2015–16 at the new Scottish Rugby Academy as a Stage 3 player. Stage 3 players are assigned to professional clubs and Horne was assigned to Glasgow Warriors.

Horne made his debut for Glasgow Warriors in a friendly match against the British Army Rugby Union side on 25 September 2015. In a 71–0 victory for the Warriors, Horne came off the bench to grab a try.

In November, 2015, Horne was loaned to London Scottish, by Glasgow Warriors, to gain more experience of playing professional rugby.

Horne remained as a Stage 3 player assigned to Glasgow Warriors in the 2016-17 season. He made his competitive debut for the Warriors in the Pro12 match against the Ospreys on 25 November 2016. Horne has an exceptional try scoring rate, averaging better than a try every other game at both club and international levels.

International career

Horne has represented Scotland at under-17, under-19 and under-20 levels.

Coming through the Scotland age grades, Horne made his debut for the Scotland 7s side on 2 December 2016 against USA 7s at the Dubai Sevens.

Horne gained his first senior XV cap for Scotland on 16 June 2018 when playing against the United States. The following week he scored two tries as Scotland beat Argentina 15-44.

On 9 October 2019 Horne scored a hat-trick in a 61-0 win over Russia at the 2019 Rugby World Cup. He also had a fourth try disallowed for a forward pass in the build up.

He was capped by Scotland 'A' on 25 June 2022 in their match against Chile.

Family

Horne's brother is the former Glasgow Warriors centre and Scotland international Peter Horne.

References

External links
 
 Glasgow Warriors biography
 Glasgow Warriors fansite biography
 Under 20 match report

1995 births
Living people
Currie RFC players
Glasgow Hawks players
Glasgow Warriors players
Howe of Fife RFC players
London Scottish F.C. players
Male rugby sevens players
People educated at Bell Baxter High School
People educated at Strathallan School
Rugby union players from Dundee
Scotland international rugby sevens players
Scotland international rugby union players
Scottish rugby union players
Rugby union scrum-halves
Scotland 'A' international rugby union players